Yunus Emre Basar (born November 5, 1995) competing in the 77 kg division of Greco-Roman wrestling. He won one of the bronze medals in the 77kg event at the 2022 World Wrestling Championships held in Belgrade, Serbia. He is a member of the İstanbul Büyükşehir Belediyesi S.K.

Career 
Turkey's Yunus Emre Basar earned a silver medal at the 2021 European Wrestling Championships.

In 2022, he won the gold medal in his event at the Vehbi Emre & Hamit Kaplan Tournament held in Istanbul, Turkey.

Achievements

References

External links
 

Living people
Place of birth missing (living people)
Turkish male sport wrestlers
Wrestlers at the 2019 European Games
European Wrestling Championships medalists
Competitors at the 2018 Mediterranean Games
Mediterranean Games gold medalists for Turkey
Mediterranean Games medalists in wrestling
1995 births
21st-century Turkish people
World Wrestling Championships medalists